Froberville is a commune in the Seine-Maritime department in the Normandy region in northern France.

Geography

Heraldry

Population

Places of interest
 The church of St.Hélène, dating from the nineteenth century.
 The Château d'Hainneville
 The fourteenth century chapel of St. Eloi.

See also
Communes of the Seine-Maritime department

References

External links

 Panorama of Froberville

Communes of Seine-Maritime